Champagne in paradiso (Italian for 'Champagne in Paradise') is a 1984 Italian musicarello film directed by Aldo Grimaldi and starring Al Bano and Romina Power. It is the last film of the couple.

Cast 

 Romina Power as  Paola Davis
 Albano Carrisi as  Marco Allegri 
 Renzo Montagnani as Don Giovanni 
 Anna Mazzamauro as  Cesarina/Tina
 Gigi Reder as The School Principal
 Francesca Romana Coluzzi as Miss Lorenza
 Edmund Purdom as Mr. Davis 
 Gegia as  Mamma
 Gianni Magni as  The Major
 Ylenia Carrisi as Ylenia
  Yari Carrisi as  Yari

References

External links

Musicarelli
1980s musical comedy films
Films directed by Aldo Grimaldi
1984 comedy films
1984 films
1980s Italian-language films
1980s Italian films